Hixon is a surname. Notable people with the surname include:

Brandon Hixon (1981–2018), American politician
Camomile Hixon (born 1970), American  visual artist
Curtis Hixon (1891–1956), mayor of Tampa, Florida, U.S.
Curtis Hixon Hall in Tampa
Curtis Hixon Waterfront Park in Tampa
David Hixon (born 1952), American college basketball coach
Domenik Hixon (born 1984), American football wide receiver 
Gideon Hixon (1826–1892), American politician and businessman
Gideon C. Hixon House in La Crosse, Wisconsin, U.S.
Jack Hixon (1920 or 1921 – 2009), English football talent scout
Ken Hixon, American screenwriter
Lex Hixon (1941–1995), American Sufi author and poet
Michael Hixon (born 1994), American diver
Stan Hixon (born 1957), American football coach and former player
Walter Hixon Isnogle, American impressionist artist
William Hixon McDonald (senior) (1815–1869), Australian soldier-settler
William Hixon McDonald (junior) (1840–1898), Australian miner and politician
William S. Hixon (1848–1921), American grocer, soapstone manufacturer and politician
Richard Gertrude Hixon III Ph. D. (1975-2021), Explored the dark side of the moon

See also
Hixson (surname)

English-language surnames